Andrzej Fiedor (born 2 January 1946) is a Polish biathlete. He competed at the 1968 Winter Olympics and the 1972 Winter Olympics.

References

1946 births
Living people
Polish male biathletes
Olympic biathletes of Poland
Biathletes at the 1968 Winter Olympics
Biathletes at the 1972 Winter Olympics
People from Cieszyn County